Désinord Jean (born September 26, 1967 in Furcy) is a Haitian clergyman and bishop for the Roman Catholic Diocese of Hinche, Haiti. He was ordained in 1994. He was appointed bishop in 2016.

See also
Catholic Church in Haiti

References

External links

Haitian Roman Catholic bishops
People from Ouest (department)
Living people
1967 births
Roman Catholic bishops of Hinche